Daniel Amartey (born 21 December 1994) is a Ghanaian professional footballer who plays as a defender or midfielder for Premier League club Leicester City and the Ghana national team.

A graduate of International Allies' youth academy, Amartey played for Djurgården and Copenhagen before joining Leicester City in 2016.

Club career

Djurgårdens IF
Amartey started out playing for second-tier club International Allies in Ghana where he was spotted as a sixteen-year-old by Magnus Pehrsson who was on a scouting trip in Africa during his preparation to take over as manager of Djurgårdens IF. When Pehrsson became manager he secured the transfer rights for Amartey from the day he turned 18. To help prepare Amartey for his future permanent move to Sweden in 2013, the club brought him over for shorter periods of time in both 2011 and 2012 where he got to play for the club's U21 team.

Amartey made his Svenska Cupen debut on 3 March 2013 against Umeå FC. He then made his league debut in the 2013 Allsvenskan opening game away against Helsingborgs IF on 31 March. Amartey was praised by the media for his strong start to the 2013 season, and foreign clubs like FC Schalke 04 and 1. FC Kaiserslautern started to scout him. On 26 May he scored his first ever goal for the club when he headed home the 1–1 equalizer in the 2013 Svenska Cupen Final which Djurgården eventually lost against IFK Göteborg on penalties. After his first season in the Swedish league as an eighteen-year-old Amartey was ranked as the 10th-best player in the league by newspaper Expressen and 18th best by Aftonbladet. In November 2013 Amartey confirmed that he was in talks with Liverpool F.C. over a possible move to the English club.

Copenhagen
In July 2014, Amartey moved to F.C. Copenhagen for a fee of €2.5 million plus add-ons, and made his Superliga-debut on 20 July in a match against Silkeborg IF.

Leicester City

On 22 January 2016, Amartey joined Premier League side Leicester City on a four-and-a-half-year contract for a fee around the region of up to £6 million. In his first season in his new country, Amartey featured five times as his team Leicester City won the Premier League title. He made his debut for the club on 27 February 2016, in 1–0 home league win over Norwich City.

In the 2016–17 season, Amartey became a first team regular following the departure of N'Golo Kanté. partnering teammate Danny Drinkwater in the central midfield role. While his workrate roughly equalled Kanté's, he has been unable to match his tackles and interceptions. On 14 September 2016, Amartey started in his Champions League debut for Leicester in a 3–0 away win over Club Brugge in the group stage. Amartey scored his first goal for Leicester in an 88th-minute equaliser away at Stoke City on 17 December 2016, salvaging a 2–2 draw. On 8 February 2017, just over 12 hours after returning to Leicester from international duty, Amartey played 120 minutes (including AET) in a 3–1 FA Cup fourth-round replay win over Derby County.

In October 2018, Amartey broke his ankle in a game against West Ham United, ruling him out for the rest of the 2018–19 season.

Out of action for nearly a year, the closest Amartey came to a first team return was making the bench for an EFL Cup match against Luton Town in September 2019. He made his first team return almost two years after his injury in an EFL Cup match against Arsenal on 23 September 2020, which Leicester lost 2–0. Four days later he made his Premier League return when he started away at Manchester City in a 5–2 win. On 18 February 2021, Amartey started in his Europa League debut for Leicester in a 0–0 away draw against Slavia Prague in the first leg of the Europa League round of 32 tie. On 6 March 2021, Amartey scored his first goal for the Foxes in over four years, heading in a late winner to seal a 2–1 away league win over Brighton & Hove Albion. Amartey and Leicester started the 2021–22 season with the 2021 FA Community Shield against Manchester City. Amartey played the full match as Iheanacho scored the winning goal, an 89th-minute penalty against his former club.

International career
In May 2012 Amartey made his debut for the Ghana national under-20 football team in a game against Nigeria. He was also selected to play in the 2013 FIFA U-20 World Cup but Djurgården wanted to keep him in Sweden since the tournament clashed with the 2013 Allsvenskan season. In January 2015, Amartey played in all the group matches for Ghana at the 2015 Africa Cup of Nations, where the Black Stars finished as runners-up.

He played six times at the 2017 Africa Cup of Nations, lasting 90 minutes in every match to help Ghana finish fourth in the tournament. His performances saw him named in the CAF Team of the tournament. Amartey featured in the 2021 Africa Cup of Nations in Cameroon whom the Ghana national team was eliminated in the early stage of the competition.

Controversy
On 15 May 2021, following Leicester City's FA Cup final victory over Chelsea, Amartey was filmed picking up a Chelsea pennant in the Leicester dressing room and throwing it over his shoulder to the floor in a video that went viral. He received criticism and backlash from many social media users, who deemed the gesture disrespectful. Leicester City later issued an apology to Chelsea, who accepted.

Career statistics

Club

International

Honours
Copenhagen
Danish Superliga: 2015–16
Danish Cup: 2014–15, 2015–16

Leicester City
Premier League: 2015–16
FA Cup: 2020–21
FA Community Shield: 2021

Ghana
Africa Cup of Nations runner-up: 2015

References

External links

Profile at the Leicester City F.C. website

1994 births
Living people
Footballers from Accra
Ghanaian footballers
Ghana international footballers
Association football midfielders
International Allies F.C. players
Djurgårdens IF Fotboll players
F.C. Copenhagen players
Leicester City F.C. players
Allsvenskan players
Danish Superliga players
Premier League players
2015 Africa Cup of Nations players
2017 Africa Cup of Nations players
2021 Africa Cup of Nations players
2022 FIFA World Cup players
Ghanaian expatriate footballers
Expatriate men's footballers in Denmark
Expatriate footballers in England
Expatriate footballers in Sweden
Ghanaian expatriate sportspeople in Denmark
Ghanaian expatriate sportspeople in England
Ghanaian expatriate sportspeople in Sweden